Antonio "Toni" Amor Fernández (born 6 November 1976) is a Spanish assistant manager of Liga MX club Monterrey.

Coaching career
Born Palma, Mallorca, Balearic Islands, Amor was a player but retired at the age of 23. He then became a manager of UD Arenal's youth setup, subsequently working with the reserve team before being appointed first team manager in 2003, aged just 26.

In April 2005, Amor agreed to join CD Atlético Baleares as their manager, achieving promotion to Tercera División in his first season and finishing sixth in his second, one point shy of the play-offs. On 26 July 2007, he was named Jaume Bauzà's assistant at RCD Mallorca B.

In 2010, Amor left the Bermellones and was appointed manager of CD San Francisco's Juvenil A squad. He left the latter club the following February, and in May, he moved abroad after being named technical director at Al-Wasl FC.

In April 2014, Amor signed for Al-Hilal FC, being named Sami Al-Jaber's assistant. He continued to work as an assistant at Al-Wahda FC and Al-Shabab Riyadh before returning to his home country in September 2017, after being appointed manager of UD Ibiza.

On 18 April 2018, Amor was sacked from Ibiza, and subsequently returned to his former club Arenal to work as a technical director. On 4 November of the following year, he was named Javier Aguirre's assistant at La Liga side CD Leganés.

References

External links

1976 births
Living people
Sportspeople from Palma de Mallorca
Spanish football managers
Tercera División managers
CD Atlético Baleares managers
UD Ibiza managers
Spanish expatriate football managers
Spanish expatriate sportspeople in the United Arab Emirates
Spanish expatriate sportspeople in Saudi Arabia
Expatriate football managers in the United Arab Emirates
Expatriate football managers in Saudi Arabia
C.F. Monterrey non-playing staff